The Bell is a British 3-wheeled cyclecar that was made in 1920 by W.G. Bell of Rochester, Kent.

The car was a three-wheeler with the single wheel at the front and was powered by a JAP or Precision engine. The cars were advertised, but it is not certain that series production ever started.

See also
 List of car manufacturers of the United Kingdom

References
Beaulieu Encyclopedia of the Automobile. G.N. Georgano (editor). year=2000. HMSO London. 

Cyclecars
Defunct motor vehicle manufacturers of England
Vehicle manufacturing companies established in 1920
Defunct companies based in Kent